Ramrai  village is known for holy place because of lord rama's arrivalJind district of the state of Haryana, India. Ramrai  is a traditional south-west Yaksha of the Kurukshetra region. 

There are various castes, living with brotherhood to each another 
The village's name derives from Rama's arrival. There is an old temple to Parashurama in the village.Besides this Ch. Chander Bhan Ex.S.P & Chairman Haryana Public Service Commission and his son i.e. Prof. Dharmender Singh Dhull who fought Assembly election on Congress Ticket in 2014 from Julana constituency also belongs to the village Ramrai.
Village Ramrai is basically famous for its swimmings. A lot of national and state players comes from here in swimming. 
Notable people from the village include Chaudhary Dal Singh, the first Irrigation and Power Minister of Haryana, and Parminder Singh Dhull, the MLA for the Julana constituency of the Haryana Legislative Assembly for term 2009–2014.

References

Villages in Jind district